The Cinemalaya Philippine Independent Film Festival is a film festival in the Philippines held annually during the month August at the Cultural Center of the Philippines Complex and various cinemas. Its aim is the development and promotion of Filipino independent films. The film festival is organized by the Cinemalaya Foundation, Inc. with the support of the Cultural Center of the Philippines and Econolink Investments, Inc.

Each year, the Festival provides "seed investments" of ₱500,000 (US$10,000~) to ten independent filmmakers. It has since been increased to ₱1,000,000 (US$20,000~) since 2019. These ten "finalists" are culled from hundreds of submissions from all over the Philippines. Their films debut at the festival, together with in-competition short films, as well as various out-of-competition works.

The organizing committee, headed by veteran Filipino director and actress Laurice Guillen, oversees the production of the films and the festival.

The latest edition, 18th edition of the festival was held from August 5 – October 31, 2022, at the Cultural Center of the Philippines, in select mall cinemas, and online.

History 
The Cinemalaya Philippine Independent Film Festival is a film competition and festival that aims to encourage the creation of new cinematic works by Filipino filmmakers – works that boldly articulate and freely interpret the Filipino experience with fresh insight and artistic integrity. It also aims to invigorate the Philippine filmmaking by developing a new breed of Filipino filmmakers. Each year, ten fresh talents are given a seed grant in order to create the film of their dreams. These films, along with ten short films under the Short Feature Category, are then featured in the film festival at the Cultural Center of the Philippines every August and compete for the coveted Balanghai Award. An array of exhibition films are also shown at the CCP under different sections such as Visions of Asia, Indie Nation, Best of the Festivals, Premieres, Dokyu, Retrospective, Tributes, and Digital Classics.

Aside from the screenings are other exciting film-related events such as book launchings, talkbacks with filmmakers, and Cinemalaya conversations, where students and aspiring filmmakers get to talk to select special guests about filmmaking and production. Also an integral part of the festival is the Cinemalaya Campus, a conference that looks at all aspects of independent filmmaking and distribution.

Cinemalaya Foundation Inc. 
The Cinemalaya Foundation is a non-stock, not-for-profit, non-government foundation, committed to the development and promotion of Philippine Independent film.

The Cinemalaya Foundation was established for the following purposes: to help develop and support the production of cinematic works of Filipino independent filmmakers that boldly articulate and freely interpret the Filipino experience with fresh insight and artistic integrity; to discover, encourage, support, train and recognize gifted Filipino independent filmmakers; to promote Filipino independent films locally and internationally; and to establish a network for exchange, communication, and cooperation among members of the independent film sector.

The core project of the Cinemalaya is the annual Cinemalaya Independent Film Festival and Competition which provide financial grants for the production of, at most, 10 full-length feature films which will then compete for the Best Full-length Film award. It also awards financial grants to the production of five full-length feature films by veteran directors in the Directors Showcase category. The Cinemalaya competition also recognizes the work of short filmmakers . The Cinemalaya Independent Film Congress is an important component of the Festival, providing a venue for interaction and dialogue between alternative filmmakers and those in the mainstream.

The Cinemalaya Foundation also aims to support other projects such as national outreach, seminars and workshops on production, marketing and distribution of independent films. It hopes to strengthen the presence of Filipino independent films in foreign festivals and competitions, encouraging Filipino filmmakers to enter and be part of the international film circuit.

Major award winners 
In 2010 (6th edition), the festival separated the full-length entries to two separate competitions: The Directors' Showcase and the New Breed section. The five feature-film entries will compete under the Directors' Showcase which are presented by veteran film directors of the country. While the other ten feature-film entries will compete under the New Breed section which are presented by first-time or young filmmakers working today. The Short Film section has also ten competing entries. During the 2015 Awarding Ceremony, The Cinemalaya Foundation announced that on its 12th edition, there will two competitions, the main competition (Full Length Feature) and the short film features.

New Breed

Directors' Showcase

Main Competition (Full-Length Features)

Short films

References

External links
 

Film festivals in the Philippines
Festivals in Metro Manila
Cinemalaya Independent Film Festival